Silesian Gorals (Cieszyn Silesian: Gorole; literally "highlanders") are an ethnographic group (subgroup of  Gorals) living in Silesian Beskids and Moravian-Silesian Beskids within historical region of Cieszyn Silesia. They are one of the four major ethnographic groups of Cieszyn Silesia.

Vlach colonization of Silesian Beskids began in the late 15th century roughly at the time when Brenna was first mentioned in 1490. It peaked in two following centuries. The group now shares a lot of cultural traits with other Gorals of Western Carpathians stemming from a common way of living from shepherding in mountainous pastures, but they are also characterised by various different cultural and spiritual elements like dialect, beliefs, customs, costume, etc.

Wincenty Pol in his survey of Gorals in the middle of the 19th century subdivided Silesian Gorals into 4 groups:
 Breniacy – in Brenna.
 Wiślanie – in Wisła.
 Jabłonkowianie (Jablunkov Gorals) – exemplary Silesian Gorals living in mountainous villages around Jablunkov (Polish: Jabłonków) including Koniaków, Jaworzynka, Istebna, Bukovec (Bukowiec), Mosty, Písek (Piosek), Dolní and Horní Lomná (Łomna Dolna i Górna).
 Morawianie (Moravians) – Gorals in the villages: Krásná, Morávka and Pražmo. Their dialect was transitional between the Polish and Czech language (see also: Moravians and Lach dialects).

Gorolski Święto is an annual international cultural and folklore festival held in Jablunkov with a primary goal to present folklore of the local Gorals.

Gallery

See also
Silesia

Notes

References 

Gorals
Cieszyn Silesia
Ethnic groups in Poland
Ethnic groups in the Czech Republic
Silesian Voivodeship